The LE-9 is a liquid cryogenic rocket engine burning liquid hydrogen and liquid oxygen in an expander bleed cycle. Two or three will be used to power the core stage of the H3 launch vehicle.

The newly developed LE-9 engine is the most important factor in achieving cost reduction, improved safety and increased thrust. The expander bleed cycle used in the LE-9 engine is a highly reliable combustion method that Japan has put into practical use for the LE-5A/B engine.

Firing tests of the LE-9 first-stage engine began in April 2017.

On 21 January 2022, the launch of the first H3 was rescheduled to FY 2022 or later, citing technical problems regarding the first stage LE-9 engine.

As of February 2023, the first flight of H3 was scheduled to liftoff February 17th. However, following a nominal countdown and LE-9 ignition, the launch was held before liftoff because “an anomaly was found in the first stage system and ignition signals for SRB-3s were not sent.”  JAXA also said that they would need to rollback the rocket to the VAB before attempting a second launch attempt before the end of March.

See also
 H3 Launch Vehicle
 LE-7
 LE-5

References
 Japanese Wikipedia LE-X (in Japanese)

External links
 Mitsubishi Heavy Industries Ltd. Rocket Engines

Rocket engines of Japan
Rocket engines using hydrogen propellant
Rocket engines using the expander cycle